Ronald Alfred Brierley (born 2 August 1937) is a New Zealand born investor and corporate raider, chairman and director of a number of companies in Australia, New Zealand and the UK.

He founded R. A. Brierley Investments Ltd (BIL; renamed GuocoLeisure from October 2007) in March 1961 with no capital. By 1984 BIL was the largest company in New Zealand by market capitalization, and in 1987 had 160,000 shareholders, with a stake in over 300 companies, including Paris department store Galleries Lafayette and Air New Zealand.

In April 2021, Brierley pleaded guilty to three counts of possessing child abuse material and rescinded his 1988 knighthood after the government had initiated the process of having it removed.

Personal life

Brierley was born in Wellington in 1937 to middle-class parents. He went to primary school at Island Bay School, and Wellington College.

At Wellington College, he joined the New Stamp Dealers Federation, and began his first business venture selling stamps to students and staff. He was still one of the largest buyers and sellers of stamps in the world in 2014, recognised by the name "Lionheart".

Brierley is a cricket enthusiast. He was a trustee of the Sydney Cricket and Sports Ground Trust from 1988 to 1996, and President of New Zealand Cricket in 1995. He also likes travelling by train. He was appointed a Knight Bachelor in the 1988 New Year Honours, for services to business management and the community.

On 18 December 2019, various news outlets reported that Brierley had been arrested in Sydney on charges of possession of child pornography. He pleaded guilty in 2021, and the process of his being stripped of his knighthood has begun by Jacinda Ardern, New Zealand's Prime Minister. On 4 May 2021, Brierley informed the Prime Minister of his resignation of his knighthood.

Business career

Early career

Brierley began his career as the publisher of a horse racing tip sheet. He followed this with an investment analysis newsletter "Stocks and Shares"  which he founded in 1956 at age 19. This sought to identify undervalued special situations and suggest what could be done with the companies.

His first bid via R.A.Brierley Investments Ltd was for the Otago Farmers Co-Operative Association in July 1961, which had become attractive as a target due to its cheapness, its unusual legal structure and the company being moved to an unofficial NZX bourse due to failing to comply with exchange listing requirements. While Brierley's offer was rejected, the company was forced into a change in policy and the market price of the company leapt upwards.

Other targets of Brierley's activist investment style in the 1960s and 1970s included the Southern Cross Building Society, the Finance Corporation of New Zealand, Citizens and Graziers and the Southern Farmers Co-operative Ltd in Australia.
Brierley's view was that his holding company, Brierley Investments Ltd, was "a monitoring organisation that continually evaluated the performance of various companies and acted as a catalyst to promote the most effective ownership of a company."

Post BIL

On 29 March 1990, Brierley was appointed chairman of investment holding company Guinness Peat Group (GPG). As chairman Brierley publicly attacked and defeated the plan to merge the London Stock Exchange with Deutsche Börse in 2001.

In December 2015, Brierley, through his new company, Mercantile Investments, launched a hostile takeover of Australian shipping company Richfield International.

Political activities 

Brierley was involved in local politics in Wellington in the 1950s and 1960s. He was a member of the Independent United Action Group which, under the leadership of Saul Goldsmith, campaigned to preserve the city's tramway system and halt drinking water fluoridation. At the 1959, 1962 and 1965 local elections, Brierley stood as a candidate for the Wellington City Council on the United Action ticket. He was unsuccessful (alongside all other United Action candidates) in all three attempts.

Child sex abuse conviction 

In December 2019, Brierley was stopped and detained at Sydney International Airport following an anonymous tip-off, and he was arrested after a search of his carry-on luggage had police officers discover a large quantity of child abuse material.

On 1 April 2021, Brierley pleaded guilty to three counts of possessing child abuse material. The same day, the Prime Minister of New Zealand, Jacinda Ardern, announced that she had started moves to strip Brierley of his knighthood. Brierley forfeited his knighthood within three days of the announcement. On 14 October 2021, Brierley was sentenced to 14 months jail with a 7 month non-parole period. However, the New South Wales Court of Criminal Appeal allowed Brierley's legal team to challenge the term on 1 February 2022. The court was told that Brierley's health was deteriorating, and he was re-sentenced to 10 months jail with a 4 month non-parole period. Brierley was subsequently released from jail on 13 February 2022.

Brierley has Australian citizenship, so is unlikely to be deported to New Zealand after serving his sentence. If he was not, however, recent proposed changes by the current Morrison led government to reduce the visa cancellation criteria down to 12 months imprisonment (from 24 months) could still have seen him forcibly removed from Australia in the months ahead, and deported back to New Zealand.

References

1937 births
Corporate raiders
People educated at Wellington College (New Zealand)
New Zealand investors
Living people
People convicted of child pornography offenses
People from Wellington City
New Zealand businesspeople
New Zealand criminals
People stripped of a British Commonwealth honour